Morning Glory is the fourth attempt at breakfast television live programming on Channel 4. It was presented by Dermot O'Leary every weekday morning from 8:30–9 am. Due to low ratings, despite having Big Brother's Little Breakfast as a lead in show, it was not renewed.

The show followed on from Celebrity Big Brother 4 which ran in January 2006. The 4 Hero Les Fleurs theme was used to usher in the show. The set was predominantly red with the show's logo displayed animated with birds flying around it. Its aim was to provide entertainment interviews and not news and weather like its previous incarnations.

References

Channel 4 original programming
2006 British television series debuts
2006 British television series endings
Breakfast television in the United Kingdom